The following is a list of films produced in 1988 by the Ollywood film industry, which is based in Bhubaneshwar and Cuttack:

A-Z

References

1998
Ollywood
 Ollywood
1990s in Orissa
1998 in Indian cinema